Maximilian Lahnsteiner (born 16 August 1996) is an Austrian alpine skier who won the Europa Cup overall title in 2021.

Career
The victory in the general classification of the European Cup 2021 had made him acquire the right to be included in the Wunderteam for the world cup competitions, but a serious injury to his left cruciate ligament in training in Val Senales, caused him to lose the inaugural race in Soelden, for which he was selected, and the entire 2021-22 season.

However, in October 2022 he was again called up with the Austria national alpine ski team, once again for the inaugural race of the 2022-23 season in Soelden.

World Cup results

Europa Cup results
Lahnsteiner has won an overall Europa Cup.

FIS Alpine Ski Europa Cup
Overall: 2021

References

External links
 
 

1996 births
Living people
Austrian male alpine skiers